Sprecher Brewery is a brewery in Glendale, Wisconsin, U.S. It was founded in 1985 in Milwaukee by Randal Sprecher, and is Milwaukee's first craft brewery since Prohibition. Sprecher produces an assortment of beers, flavored malt beverages, and craft sodas, and it is famous for its root beer.

Despite producing a full range of award-winning craft beers, the brewery is arguably best known for its Black Bavarian (schwarzbier) and premium sodas. Sprecher brews more root beer than all of its alcoholic beers combined.

History

The founder, Randal Sprecher, a California native, earned his first degree in oceanography and his second in brewing. He was employed by Pabst in Milwaukee. After just over four years at Pabst, he founded his own brewery in 1985.  The new brewery was started on a budget of $40,000. Sprecher hand-manufactured and purchased equipment to keep costs down, including a 16-oz. bottling machine from Coca-Cola, and some of this equipment remains in use today. The current Sprecher facility was acquired in 1994.

In January 2020, a group of local investors acquired Sprecher Brewery, with Sharad Chadha taking the helm as CEO and President. The new leadership expanded distribution by 10 states, up to 30 total, and grew production capacity by added a new canning line and warehouse space. Over the course of two years, the company doubled to 110 people and went from running a single shift four days a week to double shifts five days a week with the capacity to expand further. In October 2021, Sprecher acquired six soda brands from Chicago-based WIT Beverage Co., including Green River.

In January 2022, Sprecher transitioned all of its beer styles from bottles to cans, and accompanied a brand refresh with new labels.

Production
Raw Wisconsin honey is used as a primary ingredient in its root beer, and Sprecher Ginger Ale uses locally grown ginger. Sprecher's recipe and method for producing its root beer has remained unchanged since its founding. The brewing uses a "fire-brewed" process that brews in a kettle with fire underneath, rather than steam, which caramelizes the sugars and helps blend flavors and create complexity.

Year-round beers
 Special Amber - Vienna Lager
 Black Bavarian - Schwarzbier
 Hefe Weiss - Bavaria wheat ale
 Abbey Triple - Belgian Tripel
 Pineapple X-Press - Belgian IPA
 Juicy IPA - Juicy India Pale Ale

Seasonal beers

Seasonal beers include:
 Mai Bock - Blonde Bock (Spring)
 Milwaukee Pils - Bohemian Style Lager(Summer)
 Oktoberfest - Märzen (Autumn)
 Winter Lager - Bavarian-Style Dunkel (Winter)

Limited release beers
 Czar Brew - Bourbon Barrel Aged Imperial Stout
 Imperial Stout - Imperial Stout
 Framboise - Belgian-Style Lambic

Sodas

 Root Beer
 Lo-Cal Root Beer
 Caffeinated Root Beer
 Maple Syrup Root Beer
 Cream Soda
 Lo-Cal Cream Soda
 Orange Dream
 Lo-Cal Orange Dream
 Cherry Cola
 Door County Cherry Soda
 Grape
 Ginger Ale - Wisconsin Ginger
 Puma Kola - Cola with vanilla + cinnamon
 Caffeinated Citrus Splash
 Ginger Beer
 Dr Sprecher
 Strawberry (Seasonal)
 Red Apple (Seasonal)
 Raspberry (Seasonal)
 Blueberry (Seasonal)
 Valencia Orange Sparkling Water
 Red Raspberry Sparkling Water
 Fresh Cut Mango Sparkling Water
 Ripe Strawberry Sparkling Water

These sodas are fairly rare in the soft drink industry in that they are sweetened with pure honey rather than sugar, high-fructose corn syrup, or a newer artificial sweetener.

Brewery tour 

Sprecher Brewery offers year-round tours of its facility, including the brew house, the refrigerated cellar, and the bottling line and warehouse. Tours conclude in the indoor beer garden where customers are welcome to sample a wide range of beers and sodas on tap.

Traveling beer garden

Sprecher has two sets of firetrucks and ambulances that serve as Milwaukee County Parks Traveling Beer Gardens from Memorial Day to Labor Day. Each set visits a Milwaukee County Park for ten (10) days, then moves to another location throughout the summer. A unique twist on Milwaukee's beer gardens at the turn of the 20th century, the Traveling Beer Gardens have proved to be a highly appreciated addition to Milwaukee County Parks and a sustainable private public partnership.

Recognition

Sprecher has earned awards for 25 different beer types in prestigious national and international competitions. Awards include: 2004 GABF Small Brewing Company of the Year and 2004 GABF Small Brewing Company Brewmaster of the Year. 2007 Australian International Beer Awards, Best of Show & Gold Medal - Russian Imperial Stout; Dopple Bock - Silver; Piper's Scotch Ale - Bronze; 2014 World Beer Cup, Gold - Black Bavarian (Schwarzbier); Bronze - Shakparo (Gluten free); 2004, Bronze - Winter Brew; 2002, Gold - Winter Brew. Several awards annually at both the Los Angeles International Beer Competition and the United States Open Beer Championships.

In a 2008, The New York Times taste test, four judges ranked Sprecher's number one among 25 root beers from across the United States for its "wonderfully balanced and complex brew." A review in the October 2009 edition of Details also praised the root beer as "elegant."

In popular culture

2005: Won "Most Deserving Small Business Office" Makeover from Xerox, Hon Furniture and Entrepreneur magazine. Featured on NBC's Today show.
In November 2006, a contestant on NBC's Deal or No Deal was offered a life-time supply of Sprecher's Root Beer, his favorite soda.

See also
Beer in Milwaukee

References

External links
Sprecher Brewery website

American soft drinks
Beer brewing companies based in Wisconsin
American companies established in 1985
Glendale, Wisconsin
Companies based in Milwaukee
1985 establishments in Wisconsin